Agyneta micaria is a species of sheet weaver found in the United States and Canada. It was described by Emerton in 1882.

References

micaria
Spiders of Canada
Spiders of the United States
Spiders described in 1882